Zona Espansione Nord, also known as ZEN or San Filippo Neri, is an economically deprived quarter on the northern outskirts of Palermo, Sicily. It is located in the VII municipality and has a population of around 16,000 people. It was constructed in 1969, under the design by architect Vittorio Gregotti, and consists of multi-storied housing projects, most of which are in a state of dilapidation. As a result of rampant unemployment, poverty, high school drop-out rate and marginalization of the residents, ZEN has become notorious for its crime, juvenile delinquency, and social degradation. The architect Massimiliano Fuksas proposed its demolition, together with other similar structures in Italy, such as the Corviale in Rome.

In 1997, ZEN changed its name to San Filippo Neri, but most Palermitans refer to it by its former name. Italian director Marco Risi used ZEN as the setting for his 1990 film Ragazzi fuori, which depicted the social problems and lack of opportunities faced by the unemployed youth of ZEN.

Bibliography
Fava Ferdinando, Lo zen di Palermo. Antropologia dell'esclusione,  introduction by Marc Augé, Franco Angeli Editore, Milano. 2008 - 
Badami Alessandra, Picone Marco, Schilleci Filippo (eds.), Città nell'emergenza. Progettare e costruire tra Gibellina e lo Zen, Palumbo Editore, Palermo. 2008 -

References 

Zones of Palermo